Kim Yeong-gil or Kim Yŏng-gil may refer to:
Kim Young-gil (born 1939), South Korean materials engineer
Kim Yung-kil (born 1944), North Korean footballer
Kim Yeong-gil (born 1965), South Korean long-distance runner